HMS Somme was an Admiralty  destroyer built for the Royal Navy during World War I. commissioned seven days before the end of the war, the ship was sold for scrap in 1932.

Description
The Admiralty S class were larger and faster versions of the preceding . They displaced  at normal load. The ships' complement was 82 officers and ratings.

The ships were powered by a single Brown-Curtis geared steam turbine that drove two propeller shafts using steam provided by three Yarrow boilers. Somme reached a speed of  during her sea trials.

The Admiralty S-class ships were armed with three single QF  Mark IV guns. One gun was positioned on the forecastle, the second was on a platform between the funnels and the third at the stern. They were equipped with a single QF 2-pounder "pom-pom" anti-aircraft gun on a platform forward of the mainmast. They were also fitted with two rotating twin mounts for  torpedoes amidships and two 18-inch (450 mm) torpedo tubes, one on each broadside abaft the forecastle.

Construction and career
Somme, the first ship of her name to serve in the Royal Navy, was ordered on 9 April 1917 as part of the Eleventh War Programme from Fairfield Shipbuilding & Engineering Company. The ship was laid down at the company's Govan shipyard in November 1917, launched on 10 August 1918 and commissioned on 4 November, joining the 14th Destroyer Flotilla of the Grand Fleet. The Royal Navy was reorganised after the end of the First World War, with Somme joining the Seventh Destroyer Flotilla in March 1919. By January 1920, Somme had been transferred to the Mediterranean Fleet, being allocated to a reserve division of the Sixth Destroyer Flotilla.

She was recommissioned on 15 December 1920. The ship re-commissioned at Portsmouth with 2/5ths crew on 4 December 1923 for service with the Eighth Destroyer Flotilla of the Atlantic Fleet. Somme served on the China Station during 1927–1929 and conducted anti-piracy patrols. The ship was sold for breaking in August 1932.

References

Bibliography
 
 
 
 
 
 

 

1918 ships
S-class destroyers (1917) of the Royal Navy